Scoarța is a commune in Gorj County, Oltenia, Romania. It is composed of eleven villages: Bobu, Budieni, Câmpu Mare, Cerătu de Copăcioasa, Colibași, Copăcioasa, Lazuri, Lintea, Mogoșani, Pișteștii din Deal and Scoarța.

Natives
 Aristotel Stamatoiu

References

Communes in Gorj County
Localities in Oltenia